No. 112 Helicopter Unit (Thoroughbreds) is a Helicopter Unit and is equipped with Mil Mi-8 based at Yelahanka AFS.

History

112 Helicopter Unit, IAF is the alma-mater of all Medium Lift Helicopters, which has been training pilots, flight engineers and flight gunners for achieving highest professional standards.

The President of India, Shri Pranab Mukherjee presented the President’s Standard to 112 Helicopter Unit of Indian Air Force on 11 March 2014 at Kanpur.

Assignments
One of the oldest IAF units, 112 Helicopter Unit serves a wartime role such as in Kargil war, Operation Pawan and Indo-Pakistani war of 1971; or supporting civil operations during cyclones, floods and VVIP movements.

Aircraft
Bell 47
Mi-8/8T

References

112